As of 2022, the COVID‑19 pandemic is an ongoing global pandemic of coronavirus disease 2019 (COVID‑19) caused by severe acute respiratory syndrome coronavirus 2 (SARS CoV‑2). Its impact has been broad, affecting general society, the global economy, culture, ecology, politics, and other areas. These aspects are discussed across many articles:

Economic impact 

 2020 Russia–Saudi Arabia oil price war
 2020 stock market crash
 Charitable activities related to the COVID-19 pandemic
 Moldovan–Romanian collaboration during the COVID-19 pandemic
 COVID-19 recession
 Financial market impact of the COVID-19 pandemic
 Impact of the COVID-19 pandemic on mink farming

By country 
 Economic impact of the COVID-19 pandemic in Canada
 Economic impact of the COVID-19 pandemic in India
 Indian migrant workers during the COVID-19 pandemic
 Economic impact of the COVID-19 pandemic in the Republic of Ireland
 COVID-19 Pandemic Unemployment Payment 
 July Jobs Stimulus
 Economic Recovery Plan 2021
 Economic impact of the COVID-19 pandemic in Malaysia 
 Economic impact of the COVID-19 pandemic in New Zealand
 Economic impact of the COVID-19 pandemic in Russia
 Economic impact of the COVID-19 pandemic in the United Kingdom
 Economic impact of the COVID-19 pandemic in the United States

By industry 
 Impact of the COVID-19 pandemic on aviation
 Impact of the COVID-19 pandemic on airlines
 World's longest domestic flight
 Impact of the COVID-19 pandemic on the cannabis industry
 Impact of the COVID-19 pandemic on the food industry
 Impact of the COVID-19 pandemic on the meat industry in Canada
 Impact of the COVID-19 pandemic on the meat industry in the United States
 Impact of the COVID-19 pandemic on the restaurant industry
 Impact of the COVID-19 pandemic on the restaurant industry in the United States
 Impact of the COVID-19 pandemic on journalism
 Impact of the COVID-19 pandemic on retail
 Impact of the COVID-19 pandemic on tourism
 Travel restrictions related to the COVID-19 pandemic

Impact on culture and entertainment 
 Impact of the COVID-19 pandemic on cinema
 List of films impacted by the COVID-19 pandemic
 Impact of the COVID-19 pandemic on education
 2020 UK GCSE and A-Level grading controversy
 Homeschooling during the COVID-19 pandemic
 Impact of the COVID-19 pandemic on education in Ghana
 Impact of the COVID-19 pandemic on education in the Republic of Ireland
 Impact of the COVID-19 pandemic on education in the United Kingdom
 Impact of the COVID-19 pandemic on education in the United States
 Impact of the COVID-19 pandemic on sports
 By type
 Impact of the COVID-19 pandemic on association football
 Impact of the COVID-19 pandemic on combat sports
 Impact of the COVID-19 pandemic on cricket
 Impact of the COVID-19 pandemic on disc golf
 Impact of the COVID-19 pandemic on Gaelic games
 Impact of the COVID-19 pandemic on motorsport
 Impact of the COVID-19 pandemic on rugby league
 By country
 Impact of the COVID-19 pandemic on sports in the Republic of Ireland
 Impact of the COVID-19 pandemic on Philippine sports
 Suspension of the 2019–20 NBA season
 Impact of the COVID-19 pandemic on television
 Impact of the COVID-19 pandemic on television in the United States 
 List of American television series impacted by the COVID-19 pandemic
 Impact of the COVID-19 pandemic on the arts and cultural heritage
 COVID-19 pandemic in popular culture
 Impact of the COVID-19 pandemic on the fashion industry 
 Impact of the COVID-19 pandemic on the music industry
 Impact of the COVID-19 pandemic on the performing arts
 Impact of the COVID-19 pandemic on the video game industry
 Impact of the COVID-19 pandemic on The Walt Disney Company

Impact on information 

Media coverage of the COVID-19 pandemic
Misinformation related to the COVID-19 pandemic
COVID-19 misinformation by governments
COVID-19 misinformation by China
COVID-19 misinformation by the United States
COVID-19 misinformation in Canada
COVID-19 misinformation in the Philippines
List of unproven methods against COVID-19
Plandemic
Wikipedia's response to the COVID-19 pandemic

Impact on society and rights 
 Gendered impact of the COVID-19 pandemic
 Human rights issues related to the COVID-19 pandemic
 COVID-19 pandemic on human rights in Argentina
 Impact of the COVID-19 pandemic on children
 Impact of the COVID-19 pandemic on foster care in the United States
 Impact of the COVID-19 pandemic on healthcare workers
 Legal issues
 Impact of the COVID-19 pandemic on abortion in the United States
 Impact of the COVID-19 pandemic on crime
 Impact of the COVID-19 pandemic on crime in the Republic of Ireland
 Impact of the COVID-19 pandemic on domestic violence
 Impact of the COVID-19 pandemic on prisons
 Impact of the COVID-19 pandemic on long-term care facilities
 Impact of the COVID-19 pandemic on the LGBT community
 Impact of the COVID-19 pandemic on public transport
 Impact of the COVID-19 pandemic on religion
 Impact of the COVID-19 pandemic on funerals
 Impact of the COVID-19 pandemic on Hajj
 Impact of the COVID-19 pandemic on the Catholic Church
 Xenophobia and racism related to the COVID-19 pandemic
 Mental health during the COVID-19 pandemic
 Social impact of the COVID-19 pandemic
 Coronavirus party 
 Impact of the COVID-19 pandemic on social media
 Social impact of the COVID-19 pandemic in Malaysia
 Social impact of the COVID-19 pandemic in New Zealand
 Social impact of the COVID-19 pandemic in Russia
 Social impact of the COVID-19 pandemic in the Republic of Ireland
 Social impact of the COVID-19 pandemic in the United Kingdom
 Social impact of the COVID-19 pandemic in the United States
 Impact of the COVID-19 pandemic on African-American communities
 Impact of the COVID-19 pandemic on Native American tribes and tribal communities
 Social stigma associated with COVID-19
 Strikes during the COVID-19 pandemic
 Workplace hazard controls for COVID-19

Political impact 

 By country:
 Impact of the COVID-19 pandemic on politics in Malaysia
 Impact of the COVID-19 pandemic on politics in the Republic of Ireland
 Impact of the COVID-19 pandemic on politics in Russia
 European Union response to the COVID-19 pandemic
 Impact of the COVID-19 pandemic on international relations
 Federal aid during the COVID-19 pandemic in Canada
 International aid related to the COVID-19 pandemic
 International reactions to the COVID-19 pandemic in Italy 
 Global ceasefire
 List of COVID-19 pandemic legislation
 National responses to the COVID-19 pandemic
 British government response to the COVID-19 pandemic
 German government response to the COVID-19 pandemic
 Ghanaian government response to the COVID-19 pandemic
 Indian government response to the COVID-19 pandemic
 Indian state government responses to the COVID-19 pandemic
 Irish government response to the COVID-19 pandemic
 New Zealand government response to the COVID-19 pandemic
 Nigerian government response to the COVID-19 pandemic
 Philippine government response to the COVID-19 pandemic
 Russian government responses to the COVID-19 pandemic
 Swedish government response to the COVID-19 pandemic
 United States responses to the COVID-19 pandemic
 U.S. federal government response to the COVID-19 pandemic
 Trump administration communication during the COVID-19 pandemic
 U.S. state and local government responses to the COVID-19 pandemic
 California government response to the COVID-19 pandemic
 Eastern States Multi-state Council
 Midwest Governors Regional Pact
 New York state government response to the COVID-19 pandemic
 Texas government response to the COVID-19 pandemic
 Western States Pact
 Vietnamese government response to the COVID-19 pandemic
 Protests over responses to the COVID-19 pandemic
 Protests over COVID-19 policies in Italy
 Protests over COVID-19 policies in Germany 
 COVID-19 anti-lockdown protests in New Zealand 
 2020–2021 Serbian protests
 COVID-19 anti-lockdown protests in the United Kingdom 
 COVID-19 anti-lockdown protests in the United States
 2020 United States anti-lockdown protests
 Open the States
 United Nations' response to the COVID-19 pandemic
 World Health Organization's response to the COVID-19 pandemic

Others 
 Anthropause 
 COVID-19 lockdowns
 Evacuations related to the COVID-19 pandemic
 Evacuations by India related to the COVID-19 pandemic
 Evacuations by the Philippines related to the COVID-19 pandemic
 Food security during the COVID-19 pandemic 
 Impact of the COVID-19 pandemic on animals
 Impact of the COVID-19 pandemic on hospitals
 Impact of the COVID-19 pandemic on ICU capacity
 Impact of the COVID-19 pandemic on language 
 Impact of the COVID-19 pandemic on other health issues
 Impact of the COVID-19 pandemic on overseas Filipinos
 Impact of the COVID-19 pandemic on people with disabilities 
 Impact of the COVID-19 pandemic on science and technology
 Impact of the COVID-19 pandemic on the environment
 Impact of the COVID-19 pandemic on migration 
 Impact of the COVID-19 pandemic on the military
 Withdrawal of U.S. troops from Iraq
 Pandemic fatigue
 Shortages related to the COVID-19 pandemic
 COVID-19 pandemic deaths
 List of deaths due to COVID-19
 COVID-19 pandemic death rates by country